The Armenian Medical Association (ArMA), founded in 2002 by Parounak Zelveian, is a professional union of doctors, biomedical scientists and public health professionals in Armenia. ArMA is a non-profit NGO with objectives of promoting high-level medical practice, education and research; fostering advanced ethical behaviour by medical professionals; protecting independence and rights of both doctors and patients.

Young Medics International Conference
The main biannual event of ArMA is the Young Medics International Conference (YMIC). Four YMICs were organized in 2001, 2003, 2005 and 2007, Yerevan, Armenia.

International Memberships
 ArMA is a member of World Medical Association (WMA)
 ArMA is a member of European Forum of Medical Associations (EFMA)

References

External links
ArMA official website
YMIC 2007 official website

Medical associations based in Armenia